Christopher Nzay Mfuyi (born 3 July 1989) is a footballer who plays as a centre back for Swiss club FC Collex-Bossy. Born in Switzerland, he represented Congo DR at international level.

Career
Born in Geneva, Mfuyi previously played for Servette from 2006–2010 in the Swiss Challenge League, and also had a loan stint at CS Chênois during the 2008–09 season.

In July 2010, Mfuyi signed a four-year contract with Ligue 1 club Valenciennes. He had limited opportunities with Valenciennes' first team, and after two years, it was announced on 21 June 2012 that Mfuyi would return to Servette, his hometown club, on a two-year contract. On 17 July 2015 it was announced that Mfuyi had signed a two-year contract with Servette, with an option for a third year.

References

External links
 Christopher Nzay Mfuyi profile at Servette FC

1989 births
Footballers from Geneva
Swiss people of Democratic Republic of the Congo descent
Swiss sportspeople of African descent
Living people
Association football defenders
Swiss men's footballers
Democratic Republic of the Congo footballers
Servette FC players
CS Chênois players
Valenciennes FC players
FC Stade Lausanne Ouchy players
Étoile Carouge FC players
Swiss 1. Liga (football) players
Swiss Challenge League players
Ligue 1 players
Swiss Super League players
2. Liga Interregional players
Swiss Promotion League players
Swiss expatriate footballers
Democratic Republic of the Congo expatriate footballers
Expatriate footballers in France
Swiss expatriate sportspeople in France
Democratic Republic of the Congo expatriate sportspeople in France